Gigi Fernández and Natasha Zvereva were the defending champions but lost in the quarterfinals to Amanda Coetzer and Inés Gorrochategui.

Coetzer and Gorrochategui won in the final 4–6, 7–6, 6–2 against Gabriela Sabatini and Larisa Savchenko.

Seeds
Champion seeds are indicated in bold text while text in italics indicates the round in which those seeds were eliminated. The top four seeded teams received byes into the second round.

Draw

Final

Top half

Bottom half

External links
 1995 WTA German Open Doubles Draw

WTA German Open
1995 WTA Tour